Paraburkholderia sediminicola is a gram-negative, catalase and oxidase-positive rod-shaped motile bacterium from the genus Paraburkholderia and the family Burkholderiaceae which was isolated from freshwater sediment. Colonies of Paraburkholderia sediminicola are creamy white in colour.

References

sediminicola
Bacteria described in 2008